is a Shinto shrine in the Daijingū neighborhood of the city of Tateyama in Chiba Prefecture, Japan. It is one of two shrines claiming to hold the title of ichinomiya of former Awa Province. The main festival of the shrine is held annually on August 10.

Enshrined kami
The primary kami enshrined at Awa Jinja is:
,  the ancestor of Imbe clan

The secondary kami enshrined at Awa Jinja are:

 , consort of Ame-no-Futodama
, ancestor of the Izumo Imbe clan, the creator of Yasakani no Magatama
, ancestor of the Awa Imbe clan
, ancestor of the Saga Imbe clan
,, ancestor of the Kii Imbe clan
, ancestor of the Tsukushi and Ise Imbe clans

History
The date of Awa Shrine’s foundation is unknown. Shrine tradition and the Kogo Shūi records of 807 AD gives the founder as a member of the Inbe clan,  (the precursors to the Nakatomi clan) during the reign of the legendary Emperor Jimmu, who settled in this area from Awa Province in Shikoku. The shrine is mentioned several times in the early Heian period Rikkokushi and it is mentioned again in the Engishiki records. It was patronized by Minamoto no Yoritomo in the Kamakura period and was recognized as the ichinomiya of the province since around this time. The shrine was completely destroyed by a large earthquake in 1499, and was rebuilt in 1593 by Satomi Yoshinari. The Satomi clan rebuilt the shrine again in 1536 and around 1592. Subsequently, in the Edo Period it was granted stipends from the Tokugawa shogunate in 1616 and 1637. After the Meiji Restoration, the Awa Jinja was designated the rank of  under the Modern system of ranked Shinto Shrines  under State Shinto in 1875. The present Honden dates from 1881 and was renovated in 2009.

During archaeological investigations in 1931, numerous Jōmon and Kofun period artifacts were recovered, including a number of bronze mirrors, clay vessels and the skeletons of 22 people.

The shrine is a ten-kilometer walk from ateyama Station on the JR East Uchibo Line.

Gallery

See also
 List of Shinto shrines
Ichinomiya

Notes

External links

References
 Plutschow, Herbe. (1996). Matsuri: The Festivals of Japan. London: RoutledgeCurzon. 
 Ponsonby-Fane, Richard Arthur Brabazon. (1959). The Imperial House of Japan.'' Kyoto: Ponsonby Memorial Society. 

Beppyo shrines
Shinto shrines in Chiba Prefecture
Awa Province (Chiba)
Tateyama, Chiba
Ichinomiya
Kanpei-taisha
Imbe clan